TOX4 (TOX high mobility group box family member 4) also known as KIAA0737, is a human gene.

References

Further reading

Transcription factors